Francois blanc may refer to:

François Blanc (1806–1877), French entrepreneur and operator of casinos
Meslier-Saint-François, a white French wine grape variety